Tuffy is a given name or a family name. 

Tuffy may refer to:

Businesses 
Tuffy Auto Service Centers, an American vehicular repair franchise
Tuffys & Tuffets, an Australian brand of underwear

Fictional characters 
Tuffy (Tom and Jerry)
Tuffy Smurf, a character from The Smurfs comic book series

People with the given name
Tuffy Abell (1892–1956), American football player 
Tuffy Conn (1892–1973), American football player 
Tuffy Griffiths (1907–1968), American boxer 
Tuffy Gosewisch (born 1983), American baseball player
Tuffy Knight (born 1936), Canadian football player
Tuffy Leemans (1912–1979), American football player
Tuffy Maul (1902–1974), American football player
Tuffy Rhodes (born 1968), American baseball player
Tuffy Stewart (1883–1934), American baseball player
Tuffy Stone (born 1962/1963), American chef and TV personality
Tuffy Thompson (1914–2000), American football player

People with the surname
Dan Tuffy, Australian-born musician, guitarist and vocalist
Joanna Tuffy (born 1965), Irish politician
Lil Tuffy (born 1972), American printmaker and designer of popular music posters

See also 
Tuff (disambiguation)